The Trinbago Knight Riders (formerly the Trinidad and Tobago Red Steel) are  a franchise cricket team of the Caribbean Premier League based in Port of Spain, Trinidad and Tobago. The Red Steel was one of the original six teams created for the tournament's inaugural 2013 season. Their home ground is Queen's Park Oval.

In 2015, Red Chillies Entertainment, the parent company of Indian Premier League team Kolkata Knight Riders, purchased stake in the Red Steel. The Red Steel went on to win the 2015 tournament. After the season, the name was changed to Trinbago Knight Riders.

History
The Trinidad & Tobago Red Steel were one of the six teams created for the Caribbean Premier League's inaugural 2013 season. In 2015, they won the tournament for the first time, defeating the Barbados Tridents by 20 runs at Queen's Park Oval.

Also in 2015, Red Chillies Entertainment, led by Bollywood actor Shah Rukh Khan and Mehta Group of businessman Jay Mehta and his wife Juhi Chawla, purchased stake in the Red Steel. Red Chillies Entertainment also owns the Indian Premier League's Kolkata Knight Riders; this was the first time an IPL team had invested in a Twenty20 cricket league outside India. In 2016, Red Chillies Entertainment took over the team's operations and changed the name to the Knight Riders. The core team remained the same in 2016, with Dwayne Bravo at the helm. However, the team's marquee foreign player is New Zealand's Brendon McCullum, who has played for KKR in the past. Brad Hogg, Javon Searles, Brendon McCullum, Colin Munro, Darren Bravo and Chris Lynn have also played for KKR before. Sunil Narine is the only player who currently plays for both the Knight Riders teams. Simon Katich in 2017, replaced fellow Australian Simon Helmot as the head coach.

Current squad
 Players with international caps are listed in bold.
As of 16 July 2022

Administration and support staff

Statistics

Most runs 

Source: ESPNcricinfo, Last updated: 5 September 2021

Most wickets 

Source: ESPNcricinfo, Last updated: 5 September 2021

Overall results

Season's summary 

Note:
 Abandoned matches are counted as NR (no result).
 Win or loss by super over or boundary count are counted as tied.
 Tied+Win - Counted as a win and Tied+Loss - Counted as a loss.
 NR indicates - No Result.

Home ground

The Trinbago Knight Riders plays their home games at the Queen's Park Oval in Port of Spain. The QPO was also the host ground of the semi-finals and finals of 2013 and 2015 editions of the CPL. The Queen's Park Oval is one of the oldest and most historic of grounds in the Caribbean as well as having one of the largest capacities, accommodating approximately 20,000 spectators in comfort. Home of the Queen's Park Cricket Club (QPCC) since 1896, it has hosted Test matches since 1930, ODIs since 1983 and T20s since 2009.

Seasons

Caribbean Premier League

The 6ixty

See also
 Trinbago Knight Riders (WCPL)

References

External links
 Trinidad and Tobago on CPLT20.com

Cricket in Trinidad and Tobago
Cricket teams in the West Indies
Caribbean Premier League teams
Cricket clubs established in 2013
Former senior cricket clubs of the West Indies
2013 establishments in Trinidad and Tobago
Red Chillies Entertainment